Worthy of Love is a 2019 Canadian young adult coming-of-age novel by Andre Fenton, which follows the story of mixed-race Nova Scotian teenager Adrian Carter, a boy who suffers from an eating disorder. The book received generally positive reviews from critics, and was commended for featuring taboo subject matter of eating disorders in male sufferers. Worthy of Love won Bronze in The Coast Best Of, a Nova Scotian annual contest.

Plot
Adrian is morbidly obese, weighing 280 pounds. He tries to minimize his bulky appearance by wearing black clothing, which does little to boost his self-esteem, particularly in school. A resident of Halifax, Nova Scotia, Adrian attends a local school where he is embarrassed during a weigh-in in gym class; compared to his peers, Adrian is extremely overweight, and his coach, who calls Adrian's bullying "petty crap", does not prevent any of the fatphobic comments that come Adrian's way. Tied of the harassment, Adrian sets a goal to lose as much weight as possible, which leads him to experiment with self-induced vomiting until he develops a habit of full-blown bulimia. He secretly binge-eats at home, and dreads the idea that a girl he is attracted to, Melody Woods (affectionately nicknamed "Mel") will never love him because he is fat and ugly. These internalized feelings only heighten his emerging eating disorder. Adrian is, however, able to find solace in a local kickboxing class in Halifax, and this is where he is able to exercise in a healthy way. Mel confronts Adrian about his weight loss and apparent eating problems, leading Adrian to question his own negative self-perception and how it all started.

Reception
Worthy of Love received mostly positive reviews from critics, owing in part to its uniquely Canadian perspective on eating disorders (with many teen fiction novels on eating disorders being published in the United States with no Canadian culture), and also in part due to its addressing of males who suffer from eating disorders. Kirkus Reviews said of the book, "Adrian is a highly sympathetic protagonist, showing sensitivity and emotional maturity that would outshine that of many adults. Accessible and engaging, full of honest feeling", although it also criticized the racial dynamics in the book; the bullies are all white, while main characters Adrian and Mel are biracial. Kristie Gadson, an American reviewer for Philadelphia-based Cleaver Magazine, viewed the book positively, stating, "candid, earnest, and full of emotion, Fenton gives us a unique yet personal story about one journey toward self-love."

References

2019 Canadian novels
Canadian young adult novels
Coming-of-age fiction
Novels about eating disorders
Novels set in Nova Scotia
Novels about boxing
Novels about race and ethnicity
Young adult romance literature